The Kingsboro Historic District is a small national historic district located in Gloversville, Fulton County, New York. The district contains 18 contributing buildings and one contributing site.  The district encompasses all the properties that face onto Veterans Park – formerly Kingsboro Avenue Park – plus five additional properties.  They are primarily one and two family residences dating to the 1820 to 1840 period and reflect the Greek Revival style.  Also included is the Kingsboro church (1838), Kingsboro Cemetery, a monument in the park, and a former elementary school which is now the Fulton County Museum.

It was listed on the National Register of Historic Places in 1975.

Gallery

References

External links

Houses on the National Register of Historic Places in New York (state)
Historic districts on the National Register of Historic Places in New York (state)
Historic districts in Fulton County, New York
Houses in Fulton County, New York
National Register of Historic Places in Fulton County, New York